Kathua is a city and municipal council located in Kathua district of Jammu Division of the Indian union territory of Jammu and Kashmir, near its border with Punjab (India) and Himachal Pradesh. The city is headquarters of Kathua district and is divided into 27 wards which constitute the Kathua Municipal Council. It is situated along NH-44. The town has a bustling industrial area and an army cantonment adjoining it.

Geography

The city is surrounded by three rivers. Ravi is  down Kathua while Ujjh is about  ahead on Jammu Highway. Kathua itself is situated along the banks of a khad which has been heavily polluted and encroached over there years and this has become a drain of sewage, dividing it into two boroughs: Parliwand, meaning the other side; and Orliwand, meaning this side. Itself being a Plain the area is surrounded in the North by snow-capped Sivalik hills. Kathua lies 88 kilometres south of Jammu.

Demographics

Population

 Total population of the Municipal Council and Outgrowth areas is 59,688 with 31,717 males and 28,149 females. The sex ratio is 888 women per 1000 men. There are 12,061 households in the Municipal Council and Outgrowth areas.

Literacy
 There are 46359 literates and 13,507 illiterates in the Municipal Council and Outgrowth areas resulting in an 86.46% literacy rate. The male and female literacy stand at 90.7% (25,605 indv.) and 81.75% (20,754) respectively.

Language
Use of Urdu is predominant in official government documents along with English, but Dogri is the mother tongue and the vernacular language of the populace along with Hindi.

Religion
Hinduism is the largest religion in Kathua, followed by over 91% of the people. Sikhism is the second-largest religion with 4.75% adherents. Christianity and Islam form 1.09% and 2.68% of the population respectively.

Climate

Kathua has a monsoon-influenced humid subtropical climate (Koppen Cwa). Kathua generally experiences extreme rainfall during the monsoon being on the windward side of Sivalik. Because of its proximity to rivers, the climate is moderate to very hot in summers and mild to very cold in winters. Summers are hot and the temperature may reach 39 degrees, while in winters, the temperature can dip to below 0 degrees at nights. 

Heavy downpour is experienced during the monsoon season in July and August. Heavy hailstorms may be experienced in February and March, but are very rare; Kathua does not experience snowfall. Fog and sometimes Smog occur regularly during the winters, especially in January and February. 

Compared with Jammu, temperatures in Kathua remain fairly lower by 3-4 degrees. December and January can be very cold especially nights, while February to April and October- November remain pleasant and dry. August is generally humid and sometimes very uncomfortable. Winters are also wet due to frequent rains due to western disturbances. Late night thunderstorms are common while May is notorious for heavy dust storms.

Tourist attractions

 Kathua has also many small canals flowing throughout the town. 
In addition to gardens and canals, the district of Kathua also contains historical landmarks such as Jasrota Fort, Jasmergarh Fort and Bhadu Fort.

Transport
Interstate and Intrastate road transport is easily accessible due to the close proximity to NH44. Jammu Airport is the nearest major airport with regular flights. The town is connected by Indian railways to all major cities of India. Intra-district transport is also easily available for travelling within the town and surrounding areas.

Gallery

See also
 Akhnoor
 Hiranagar
 Jammu
 Jammu Cantonment
 Jammu tavi
 Nagrota
 Samba, Jammu
 Talab Tillo

References

External links
 History of Kathua
 Official website of District Kathua (J&K)
 mykathua.com - A web portal about kathua

Cities and towns in Kathua district